Get Here and Stay is the second full-length album by the American indie rock band 764-HERO. The album was released on Up Records in 1998.

Critical reception
Spin deemed the album "a cool glass of lo-fi." The Times Colonist called it "feedback-drenched guitar chords and some of the most pained, emotive vocals to come out of Seattle in years." 

The Fort Worth Star-Telegram listed the album as one of the best of 1998, considering it "modest, guitar-driven love songs." The Seattle Times thought that "Polly Johnson's casual, understated drum playing should be studied by every rock drummer who equates 'loud' with 'good'."

Track listing
"Loaded Painted Red"
"History Lessons"
"Ward's Country"
"Calendar Pages"
"Ottawa Dropout"
"Watch the Silverware"
"Get Alone"
"Typo"
"Stained Glass"
"Coastline"

Personnel
 John Atkins—vocals, guitar, keyboards
 Polly Johnson—drums, percussion
 James Bertram—bass, guitar, keyboards

Additional
 Ward Johnson—organ (9), piano (10)
 Phil Ek—producer
 Kip Beelman—recorded track 8
 Jesse LeDoux—design

References

External links
 Get Here and Stay at Discogs

1998 albums
764-HERO albums
Up Records albums
Albums produced by Phil Ek